Tan Yip Jiun (born 8 August 1991) is a Malaysian male badminton player. In 2012, he became the runner-up at the Maybank Malaysia International Challenge tournament in the men's doubles event partnered with Low Juan Shen. In 2015, he won double titles at the Bahrain International tournament in the men's and mixed doubles events.

Achievements

BWF International Challenge/Series
Men's Doubles

Mixed Doubles

 BWF International Challenge tournament
 BWF International Series tournament

References

External links
 

1991 births
Living people
Malaysian sportspeople of Chinese descent
Malaysian male badminton players